Fabrizio Buschiazzo Morel (born 7 July 1996) is a Uruguayan footballer who plays as a defender for Rentistas. He also holds Italian citizenship.

Club career
Buschiazzo made his Uruguayan Primera División debut for Peñarol on 20 March 2016 in a game against Racing de Montevideo.

On 6 August 2019, he signed a 3-year contract with Italian Serie C club Siena.

On 25 September 2020 he moved to Casertana.

On 14 July 2021, he joined Once Caldas in Colombia.

On 31 January 2022, Buschiazzo returned to Italy and signed a 1.5-year contract with Foggia.

International career
Buschiazzo is a former Uruguay youth international and has represented his country at under-17 level. He was also part of Uruguay squad at 2013 South American U-17 Championship and 2013 FIFA U-17 World Cup.

References

External links
 
 

1996 births
Living people
People from Juan Lacaze
Uruguayan people of Italian descent
Uruguayan footballers
Association football defenders
Uruguayan Primera División players
Peñarol players
Argentine Primera División players
Defensa y Justicia footballers
Serie C players
Matera Calcio players
Pisa S.C. players
A.C.N. Siena 1904 players
Casertana F.C. players
Calcio Foggia 1920 players
C.A. Rentistas players
Categoría Primera A players
Once Caldas footballers
Uruguayan expatriate footballers
Expatriate footballers in Argentina
Expatriate footballers in Italy
Expatriate footballers in Colombia
Uruguayan expatriate sportspeople in Argentina
Uruguayan expatriate sportspeople in Italy
Uruguayan expatriate sportspeople in Colombia
Uruguay youth international footballers